The Jarrahdale pumpkin is an heirloom variety of winter pumpkin bred in Australia with a blue-gray skin, named after the Western Australian town of Jarrahdale. The Jarrahdale closely resembles the Queensland blue. It cuts easily, and has orange, sweet-tasting flesh.

Notes 

Squashes and pumpkins
Cucurbita